Kathleen Kinmont (born Kathleen Kinmont Smith) is an American actress who starred in film and on television. Kinmont is best known for starring in horror films.

Early years
Kinmont is the daughter of Jack Smith.

Career 
Her first feature film role was in the comedy Hardbodies (1984). Her best-known roles include the horror film Halloween 4: The Return of Michael Myers (1988) as Kelly Meeker and in Bride of Re-Animator as the title character. She played the title role in CIA Code Name: Alexa, which she reprised in the sequel CIA II: Target Alexa. She later appeared in Lime Salted Love (2005).

She starred on television series such as Santa Barbara as Marilyn Cassidy in 1992. Her big role was in the syndicated television series Renegade as Cheyenne Phillips (1992 - 1996). She was reportedly dropped from the series in 1996 when she made derogatory comments in the press about Lorenzo Lamas' future wife Shauna Sand, who had been making appearances on the show.  She has made guest appearances on such television series as Dallas, Baywatch, Silk Stalkings, V.I.P. and Days of Our Lives.

Other professional activities 
Kinmont became involved in a variety of projects as a writer, director and director of photography. She also had a photography business in 2013 in the Los Angeles area, and has released a yoga video called "Kathleen Kinmont's Restorative Core Yoga". In 2012, she contributed several articles on the topic of divorce through The Huffington Post.

Personal life 
In 1989, Kinmont married Lorenzo Lamas, with whom she had been friends for 11 years. They divorced in 1993. She is also divorced from actors Jere Burns and Doug Swander.

Filmography

Film

Television

Additional credits
 1993 CIA II: Target Alexa - writer
 2011 In Between (short film; 2011) - cinematographer
 2012 The Perfection of Anna (short film) - associate producer, cinematographer
 2012 The Adventures of Soap Man (short film) - associate producer 
 2013 Mrs. Sweeney (short film) - writer, producer, director
 2014 Bump and Grind (TV series - "Pilot") - writer, producer, director

References

External links

Actresses from Los Angeles
American bloggers
American film actresses
American soap opera actresses
American television actresses
20th-century American actresses
21st-century American actresses
Living people
American women bloggers
Year of birth missing (living people)